Wilhelm Gimmler (13 October 1890 in Hohenlinden; 19 August 1963 in Hamelin) was a German Army  general signals officer, who became Commander in Chief of Signals in the west OB West and Chief of the Armed Forces Sgnal Communications Office during World War II. Gimmler was responsible for coordinating all the cryptographic security studies undertaken by German Armed Forces and was notable for standardising wireless phraseology between different Army Groups.

References

1890 births
1963 deaths
Generals of Signal Troops
German Army personnel of World War I
German Army generals of World War II
Military personnel from Bavaria
People from Ebersberg (district)